In enzymology, an acetoacetyl-CoA reductase is an enzyme that catalyzes the chemical reaction

(R)-3-hydroxyacyl-CoA + NADP+  3-oxoacyl-CoA + NADPH + H+

Thus, the two substrates of this enzyme are (R)-3-hydroxyacyl-CoA and NADP+, whereas its 3 products are 3-oxoacyl-CoA, NADPH, and H+.

This enzyme belongs to the family of oxidoreductases, specifically those acting on the CH-OH group of donor with NAD+ or NADP+ as acceptor. The systematic name of this enzyme class is (R)-3-hydroxyacyl-CoA:NADP+ oxidoreductase. Other names in common use include acetoacetyl coenzyme A reductase, hydroxyacyl coenzyme-A dehydrogenase, NADP+-linked acetoacetyl CoA reductase, NADPH:acetoacetyl-CoA reductase, D(−)-beta-hydroxybutyryl CoA-NADP+ oxidoreductase, short chain beta-ketoacetyl(acetoacetyl)-CoA reductase, beta-ketoacyl-CoA reductase, D-3-hydroxyacyl-CoA reductase, and (R)-3-hydroxyacyl-CoA dehydrogenase. This enzyme participates in butanoate metabolism.

References 

 

EC 1.1.1
NADPH-dependent enzymes
Enzymes of known structure